Simon Tunsted ( – 1369) was an English Franciscan friar, theologian, philosopher and musician. The authorship of Quatuor Principalia Musicae, a treatise on music, is generally attributed to him.

He originated from Norwich, though his year of birth is unknown. In Norwich, he joined a Greyfriars monastery and became a doctor of theology. He went on to become master of the Minorites at Oxford (in 1351). He died  at Bruisyard, Suffolk.  He was twenty-ninth provincial superior of the Minorites in England.

Works

Tunsted wrote a commentary on the Meteorologica of Aristotle and improved the calculating device described by Richard of Wallingford in Tractatus Albionis. He is also usually credited as the author of the Quatuor Principalia Musicae, a mediaeval treatise on music which set out the musical principles on which the Ars nova movement was based.

References

Percy A. Scholes, The Oxford Companion to Music, Tenth Edition, Oxford University press, 1970

1369 deaths
People from Norwich
English writers about music
Conventual Friars Minor
14th-century English people
Year of birth unknown
Medieval music theorists